Christ Church Cathedral, Houston is the cathedral church for the Episcopal Diocese of Texas. The congregation was established in 1839, when Texas was still an independent republic. It is the oldest extant congregation in Houston and one of the oldest non-Roman Catholic churches in Texas. Many Episcopal churches in Houston and the surrounding area were founded as missions of Christ Church, such as Trinity Church, Houston, founded in 1893.

History
Located at 1117 Texas Avenue in Downtown Houston, the current building dates from 1893. In 1938 the building suffered a major fire. A firefighter sprayed down the ornately carved rood screen to prevent its destruction, and it survived with only minor damage. Everett Titcomb composed the anthem "Behold Now, Praise the Lord" for the rededication and centennial of Christ Church.

Christ Church became the cathedral of the diocese in 1949.  Presently, Christ Church has a baptized membership of more than 3000 communicants.

Clergy
Christ Church's first rector was the Rev’d Charles Gillett of Connecticut. He led the congregation to build its first church building in 1845.  James P. deWolfe was the church's rector from 1934 to 1940.  He rebuilt the edifice and started many programs before going on to be the Bishop of the Episcopal Diocese of Long Island.   The current dean is the Very Reverend Barkley S. Thompson.

Cathedral House Episcopal School
The school opened in 1986 on the campus of Christ Church Cathedral with a philosophy grounded in the teachings of Maria Montessori. Classrooms include nursery, movement, toddler, primary and kindergarten.

See also
List of the Episcopal cathedrals of the United States
List of cathedrals in the United States

References

External links

Cathedral House Episcopal School

Christ Church Houston
Episcopal churches in Texas
Cathedrals in Houston
Churches on the National Register of Historic Places in Texas
Churches in Harris County, Texas
Buildings and structures in Houston
1893 establishments in Texas
Churches completed in 1893
19th-century Episcopal church buildings
National Register of Historic Places in Houston
Recorded Texas Historic Landmarks